Leccinum andinum is a species of bolete fungus in the family Boletaceae. Found in Costa Rica and Colombia, it was described as new to science in 1989 by mycologist Roy Halling.

See also
List of Leccinum species
List of North American boletes

References

andinum
Fungi of Central America
Fungi of Colombia
Fungi described in 1989